Eeva is a feminine given name primarily found in Finland and Estonia. It is a cognate of the English given name Eve and the Latin given name Eva. People bearing the name Eeva include:
Eeva Haimi (born 1945), Finnish sprinter
Eeva Joenpelto (1921–2004), Finnish novelist
Eeva Kilpi (born 1928), Finnish writer and feminist
Eeva Kuuskoski (born 1946), Finnish politician 
Eeva Park (born 1950), Estonian writer
Eeva Ruoppa (1932–2013), Finnish cross-country skier 
Eeva Saarinen (born 1984), Finnish breaststroke swimmer 
Eeva Talsi (born 1988), Estonian violinist and singer
Eeva Tikka (born 1939), Finnish writer 
Eeva Turunen (born 1933), Finnish politician

See also
Eeva-Kaarina Aronen (1948-2015), Finnish author and journalist
Eeva-Kaarina Volanen (1921–1999), Finnish actress
Eeva-Liisa Manner (1921–1995), Finnish poet, playwright and translator

References

Estonian feminine given names
Finnish feminine given names